Theodore Physick Cather (May 20, 1889 – April 9, 1945) was a Major League Baseball player who played outfielder from -. He would play for the St. Louis Cardinals and Boston Braves.

In 1914, Cather was a member of the Braves team that went from last place to first place in two months, becoming the first team to win a pennant after being in last place on the Fourth of July.

In a brief 4-year, 201 game major league career, Cather recorded a .252 batting average (138-for-548) with 60 runs, 2 home runs
and 72 RBI.

References

External links

Major League Baseball outfielders
Baseball players from Pennsylvania
St. Louis Cardinals players
Boston Braves players
Minor league baseball managers
Johnstown Johnnies players
Lancaster Red Roses players
Troy Trojans (minor league) players
Toronto Maple Leafs (International League) players
Scranton Miners players
Jersey City Skeeters players
Montreal Royals players
Newark Bears (IL) players
Oakland Oaks (baseball) players
Sacramento Senators players
Sportspeople from Chester, Pennsylvania
Easton Farmers players
Cambridge Canners players
1889 births
1945 deaths